IKON Office Solutions was a company based in Malvern, Pennsylvania. It was the world's largest independent provider of document management systems, copiers and services until it was purchased by manufacturer Ricoh in 2008. IKON uses copiers, printers and multifunction printer technologies from leading manufacturers and document management software and systems from companies like Captaris, Kofax, and EFI.

On August 27, 2008 IKON agreed to be purchased by copier manufacturer Ricoh for $1.62 billion. 
The company has been a registered Pennsylvania corporation since 1956.

References

External links
 
Ricoh Innovations - Ricoh Research Lab 

Electronics companies established in 1952
Companies based in Chester County, Pennsylvania
Electronics companies of the United States
American companies established in 1952
Companies acquired by Ricoh
1952 establishments in Pennsylvania